Manuel María Borrero González (10 May 1883 – 7 June 1975) was President of Ecuador in 1938.

External links
 Official Website of the Ecuadorian Government about the country President's History
http://www.worldstatesmen.org/Ecuador.html

Presidents of Ecuador
1883 births
1975 deaths
People from Cuenca, Ecuador